Ernest Travers Burges  (b Brislington 14 August 1851 – d Richmond 10 June 1921) was Archdeacon of Maritzburg from 1908 until his death.

Burges was educated at Shrewsbury School and St John's College, Cambridge and ordained in 1881. After a curacy in Umzinto he was Vicar of Karkloof until 1905; and of Richmond until his death.

References

1851 births
People from Somerset
1921 deaths
Archdeacons of Maritzburg
Alumni of St John's College, Cambridge
19th-century South African Anglican priests
20th-century South African Anglican priests